Ski School is a 1991 comedy film directed by Damian Lee and starring Dean Cameron. Its plot concerns a fictional ski school. A sequel, Ski School 2, followed in 1994, also starring Cameron.

Plot

A hard-partying section of the school, Section 8, led by Dave Marshak (Dean Cameron) must face a more buttoned-up section of the school led by Reid Janssens (Mark Thomas Miller) to save their jobs. They recruit hotshot newcomer, John Roland (Tom Bresnahan) to help them win an end-of-the-season skiing competition and also play a series of hilarious pranks on Reid and his cronies (especially, Derek and Eric) along the way.

Cast
 Dean Cameron as Dave Marshak
 Tom Bresnahan as John E. Roland
 Patrick Labyorteaux as Ed Young
 Mark Thomas Miller as Reid Janssens
 Spencer Rochfort as Derek Stevens
 Darlene Vogel as Lori
 Stuart Fratkin as "Fitz" Fitzgerald
 Charlie Spradling as Paulette
 Ava Fabian as Victoria
 Gaetana Korbin as Bridget
 Mark Brandon as Anton Bryce
 John Pyper-Ferguson as Erich Blor
 Johnny Askwith as Bart

Production
Ski School was filmed at ski resorts in Oregon and Whistler, British Columbia. According to Dean Cameron, though, they were able to film on a modest budget because it was shot in the springtime so they "got May rates". Pick-up shots were done in Los Angeles about a year after principal production.

Cameron said in a 2016 interview that the film was sold to producers based solely on its title and a mockup movie poster, before a script was written and before any actors were cast. Cameron said they were given five months to make the movie to secure the financing.

According to Cameron, John was intended to be the lead character until actor Tom Bresnahan was injured while skiing and Dave Marshak was elevated to the lead. Cameron said that he "played Dave Marshak as Bugs Bunny."

According to Cameron and Stuart Fratkin, much of the comedy in the film was improvised or else written by the actors themselves.

Fratkin later wrote that he initially read for the lead role, but lost the job to Cameron. He wrote that he hesitated to accept the offer to play Fitz until his agent secured second billing for him.

The films's soundtrack features two songs by the band Lock Up, a late-1980s musical outfit featuring Tom Morello on guitar, antedating his Rage Against the Machine fame.

Release

The film was released theatrically in the United States on January 11, 1991, although released in Canada the previous year by Cineplex Odeon. Later that year, it was released on videocassette in the United States by HBO Video. In 2007, MGM released the film on DVD. Despite the fact that the back of the DVD says the film is presented in widescreen, it is actually presented in pan and scan.

After its release on home video, Cameron and Fratkin embarked on a promotional tour to pitch the movie to video rental stores.

Homage was paid to the film franchise by It's Always Sunny in Philadelphia in season 11, episode 3, where Dean Cameron makes a cameo appearance as a burnt-out "party dude" living on the ski slopes.

Reception
The film was panned by critics. A review in the Edmonton Journal was headlined "Ski School a wretched lesson in how not to make films." A review in the Montreal Gazette called it "truly abysmal" and a "brain-cell-destroying debacle."

References

External links

Ski School at Allrovi

1990s sex comedy films
1991 films
1991 comedy films
American sex comedy films
American sports comedy films
American skiing films
Canadian sex comedy films
Canadian sports comedy films
Canadian skiing films
English-language Canadian films
1990s English-language films
Films shot in British Columbia
Films shot in Los Angeles
Films shot in Oregon
Films directed by Damian Lee
Teen sex comedy films
Films produced by Damian Lee
Films set in schools
1990s American films
1990s Canadian films